Abdus Salam Pintu is a Bangladeshi politician. He is a Bangladesh Nationalist Party member and a former deputy Minister for Education. In 2018, he was sentenced to death for involvement in the 2004 Dhaka grenade attack.

Career 
Pintu served as deputy minister for education from 2001 to 2003. After that he served as deputy minister for industries from 2003 to 2006.

In January 2008, Pintu was arrested for involvement in the 2004 Dhaka grenade attack. In June 2008, the CID submitted charge sheet  accusing 22, including Pintu and his brother, Maulana Tajuddin, a leader of Harkatul Jihad al Islami. In October 2016, he was found guilty on charges of killing through common intention, planning and criminal conspiracy and was sentenced to death.

Pintu was made vice-chairman of BNP's executive committee in 2016, at which time he was in prison.

References

Living people
People from Tangail District
Bangladesh Nationalist Party politicians
5th Jatiya Sangsad members
6th Jatiya Sangsad members
8th Jatiya Sangsad members
Place of birth missing (living people)
Year of birth missing (living people)
Bangladeshi politicians convicted of crimes
Bangladeshi male criminals
Prisoners and detainees of Bangladesh